The 2009–10 Washington State Cougars men's basketball team represented Washington State University during the 2009-10 NCAA Division I men's basketball season. The team played its home games on Jack Friel Court at Beasley Coliseum in Pullman, Washington and are members of the Pacific-10 Conference. They finished the season 16–15, 6–12 in Pac-10 play and lost in the first round of the 2010 Pacific-10 Conference men's basketball tournament. They were not invited to a post season tournament.

Roster

Schedule

|-
!colspan=9| Exhibition

|-
!colspan=9| Regular Season

|-
!colspan=9| Pacific-10 Conference tournament

References

Washington State Cougars
Washington State Cougars men's basketball seasons
Washington State
Washington State